Chahar Taq (also Romanized as Chahār Ţāq) is a village in Naghan Rural District, Naghan District, Kiar County, Chaharmahal and Bakhtiari Province, Iran. At the 2006 census, its population was 210, with 50 families. The village is populated by Lurs.

History 
With the break out of Iran-Iraq war in 1980 the fields around the Chahar Taq were bulldozed for use by the Iranian military. Some bulldozed debris was piled on top of the previously exposed archaeological remains. With termination of the hostilities, when the military left the region, the flat area around the Chahar Taq became attractive place for the villagers of old Zardeh to build new homes.

References 

Populated places in Kiar County
Luri settlements in Chaharmahal and Bakhtiari Province